Alex Coutinho (born 19 June 1959) is a Ugandan physician, public health advocate, academic, and a former executive director of the Infectious Diseases Institute of College of Health Sciences under Makerere University.

Early life
Coutinho was born in Uganda. He earned a medical degree in Uganda.

Career
Coutinho's career has focused on prevention and treatment of HIV/AIDS in Africa.

Honors
 Hideyo Noguchi Africa Prize, 2013.

References

External links
  "Dr Alex Coutinho: aid is saving hundreds of thousands of lives" at Guardian.uk

Living people
1959 births
Ugandan infectious disease physicians